Key's in the Mailbox is the 23rd solo studio album released by American country artist Barbara Mandrell. The album was released September 24, 1991, on Capitol Records and was produced by Jimmy Bowen. It was Mandrell's fourth and final album for the Capitol label.

Background and content 
Key's in the Mailbox was recorded in spring 1991 at Emerald Studio in Nashville, Tennessee, United States. The album consisted of 10 tracks of songs recorded in a traditional country arrangement, similar to that of her previous Capitol releases. The opening title track was written by Harlan Howard, who previously contributed to Mandrell's 1988 release I'll Be Your Jukebox Tonight. The second track entitled "Tall Drink of Water" included a Country and Western arrangement. "Try Gettin' Over You" was co-written by American pop artist Michael Bolton and "I Love You Because" had previously been recorded by Leon Payne and Elvis Presley. The album also includes a cover of Percy Sledge's "When a Man Loves a Woman". The album was originally released on a compact disc upon its release in 1991 and was also available on audio cassette. Bill Carpenter of Allmusic gave Key's in the Mailbox three out five stars, calling the album "Heartful soul and contemporary country."

Release 
Key's in the Mailbox was released on September 24, 1991, and peaked at #62 on the Billboard Magazine Top Country Albums chart shortly afterward. It would be Mandrell's final release to chart on any Billboard album list. Key's in the Mailbox was Mandrell's final studio release for Capitol Records, after recording four albums for the label between 1988 and 1991.

Track list

Personnel 
From album liner notes

 Rick Baird - background vocals
 Eddie Bayers – drums
 Dan Britton - background vocals
 Walt Cunningham - horns (synth), strings (synth)
 Jerry Douglas - dobro
 Paul Franklin – steel guitar
 John Jarvis - piano
 Terry Kaufman - background vocals
 Barbara Mandrell – lead vocals
 George Marinelli - electric guitar
 Jimmy Ponder - background vocals
 Brent Rowan - electric guitar
 Lee Satterfield - background vocals
 Leland Sklar – bass
 Harry Stinson - background vocals
 Billy Joe Walker Jr. - acoustic guitar
 Chris Walters - synthesizer
 Lonnie Wilson - background vocals
 Jonathan Yudkin - fiddle

Chart positions

References 

1991 albums
Barbara Mandrell albums
Albums produced by Jimmy Bowen
Capitol Records albums